The Diocese Smolensk is an eparchy of the Russian Orthodox Church with its center in Smolensk. The city cathedral is the Cathedral of the Assumption of the Blessed Virgin Mary.

Eparchies of the Russian Orthodox Church